¡Mayday! (stylized in all caps as ¡MAYD∀Y!) is an American hip hop group from Miami, Florida. The group comprises rappers Bernardo "Bernz" Garcia and Ben "Wrekonize" Miller, along with producer and percussionist Andrews "NonMS" Mujica. Until 2015, the group also included keyboard player and guitarist Aaron Eckhart (a.k.a. Plex Luthor), drummer Terrel (a.k.a. L T Hopkins), and bassist Gianni Perocapi (a.k.a. Gianni Ca$h). The band was formerly signed to Tech N9ne and Travis O'Guin's Strange Music label. As of May 1, 2022, all future releases will be on their own label Mayday Music distributed by It Goes Up.

Career

Foundation and Early Days (2003-2009) 
The group was founded by Plex Luthor and Bernz in Miami, 2003. The band is known for its Miami-underground hit "Quicksand", which earned them a deal with SouthBeat Records, and their first single and 2006 music video "Groundhog Day", featuring Cee-Lo Green (directed by Jokes) which received over 2 million views on the online video site YouTube within only a day of being added. The band released their first studio album, ¡Mayday!, in September 2006.

In 2008, producer Gianni Ca$h joined the group. In 2009, vocalist and producer Wrekonize, percussionist NonMS, and drummer L.T. Hopkins joined ¡Mayday!, bringing the number of members to 6. In February 2009, ¡Mayday! released their first EP "The Thinnest Line". A few months later, in June 2009, they released a follow-up EP titled "Technology".

Lords of the Fly & Stuck on an Island (2010) 
Lil Wayne worked with the group for two unofficial videos; both videos - "Da Da Da" and "Get a Life", were filmed on the roof of a building in the middle of the day, with spectators apparently attending a free concert. Shortly after working with Lil Wayne, remixes of both tracks, plus another Lil Wayne track "On Fire" were released on ¡Mayday!'s first mixtape "Lords of the Fly". The mixtape included new tracks, remixes, and freestyles to serve as a prelude to their next album Stuck on an Island, which released shortly after.

Signing with Strange Music (2011 - 2022) 
In early 2011 independent label frontman Tech N9ne reached out to ¡Mayday!, and featured them on two tracks of his album Welcome to Strangeland. Bernz and Wrekonize were also featured on a bonus track of the album. On June 3, 2011, Mayday signed with Strange Music.

Their third studio album, Take Me to Your Leader was their first major album released under Strange Music on March 26, 2012. The lead single from that album titled "Badlands" and featuring Tech N9ne received over half a million views on YouTube within the first two months. On August 27, 2012, Miami New Times uploaded a list of the 50 Best Miami Bands of All Time where ¡Mayday! was listed as #27. Along with their placement on the list, Miami New Times stated that "¡Mayday! just might be Miami rap's future." On August 7, 2012, ¡Mayday! released their first EP under Strange Music, "Thrift Store Halos".

On July 16, 2013, Mayday released their fourth studio album Believers. They also featured on Tech N9ne's single "Fragile", along with Kendrick Lamar, which was released shortly after Believers. In 2013, the band went on tour with Tech N9ne during his Something Else Tour.

In 2014 on June 10, Members of ¡Mayday! teamed up with newly signed Strange Music artist Murs to bring together ¡Mursday!. Shortly after the release of ¡Mursday!, ¡Mayday! and Murs released a free EP on SoundCloud presented by Boost Mobile titled "Ready 2 Run".

Shortly before ¡Mayday! released their sixth studio album Future Vintage on September 18, 2015, Plex Luthor formally departed the group on good terms. After the album release, the group toured all around the country. Along with touring, rappers Bernz and Wrekonize have been releasing their solo albums. On June 22, 2017, while on Facebook live, they announced their new album called Search Party with the album cover and a release date of September 8, 2017. On September 7, 2018, they released their next album called South of 5th.

Departure from Strange Music, Mayday Music (2022 - present) 
On May 1, 2022, during the group’s performance at Red Rocks Park and Amphitheater of Tech N9ne’s Asin9ne tour, ¡Mayday! addressed to the rumors in regards about the group’s current status with Strange Music. The group confirmed that they have amicably parted ways with Strange Music and formed a new independent record label, Mayday Music. Despite forming a new record label, ¡Mayday! will continue to work with former labelmate Tech N9ne and Strange Music co-founder Travis O’Guin as their new label will be distributed by Strange Music’s distribution company, It Goes Up Entertainment. On the same day, ¡Mayday! released a new single under their newly formed label, “Own Way.”

Discography

Studio albums

EPs

Mixtapes

Singles

As lead artist

As featured artist

Guest appearances

References

External links
 

American hip hop groups
Southern hip hop groups
Rap rock groups
Musical groups from Miami